NGC 4874 is a giant elliptical galaxy. It was discovered by the British astronomer Frederick William Herschel I in 1785, who catalogued it as a bright patch of nebulous feature. The second-brightest galaxy within the northern Coma Cluster, it is located at a distance of 109 megaparsecs (350,000,000 light-years) from Earth.

Characteristics
The galaxy is surrounded by an immense stellar halo that extends up to one million light-years in diameter. It is also enveloped by a huge cloud of interstellar medium that is currently being heated by action of infalling material from its central supermassive black hole. A jet of highly energetic plasma extends out to 1,700 light-years from its center. The galaxy has 18,700 ± 2,260 globular clusters.

See also
 List of largest galaxies

References

External links
 

Elliptical galaxies
4874
Coma Cluster
Coma Berenices
044628